Pimay was an ancient Egyptian prince, son of pharaoh Shoshenq III, who served as a Great Chief of the Ma during his father's reign.

Identity
While it was traditionally assumed that Pimay succeeded his father, newer archaeological evidence uncovered by Aidan Dodson in 1993 established that a new Tanite dynasty 22 king named Shoshenq IV actually succeeded Shoshenq III. Pimay was a different man from king Pami of the 22nd Dynasty because the orthography and translation of their respective names are different. While the name Pami reads as "The Cat" in Egyptian, the name Pimay translates as "The Lion". King Pami's name was mistakenly transcribed into Pimay by past historians based on the common (and now erroneous) view that he was Shoshenq III's son and successor. Moreover, if Pimay did indeed outlive his father, he should have succeeded his father as king rather than the obscure Shoshenq IV who is not attested as a son of Shoshenq III in contemporary historical sources. Consequently, it seems certain that Shoshenq III outlived all of his sons through his nearly 4 decade long reign. Pimay, hence, likely predeceased his father.

It is possible that Pimay also was a governor at Sais in the Western Nile Delta, as suggested by a statue group dedicated by him which was rediscovered in that city. If so, he was an indirect predecessor of the Great Chief of the Ma Osorkon C, who in turn was succeeded by the future pharaoh of the 24th Dynasty, Tefnakht.

References

People of the Twenty-second Dynasty of Egypt
Ancient Egyptian princes
8th-century BC rulers
Chiefs of the Ma